Yeni Salihlispor (also known as Salihlispor) is a Turkish football club based in Salihli, Manisa. It was founded in 1980 and its colors are green and white.

The club played in the Turkish Second Football League (second tier) from the 1984–85 season to the 2000–01 season.

In the 2012–13 season, Yeni Salihlispor participated in the Turkish Regional Amateur League.

Stadium
Currently the team plays at the 4978-capacity Ramiz Turan Stadyumu in Salihli.

League participations
TFF Second League:1985–2001
TFF Third League: 2001–2002
Turkish Regional Amateur League: 2002–

Notable managers
Ersun Yanal 1997–1998

References

External links
Yeni Salihlispor at Mackolik statistical site
Yeni Salihlispor at the Turkish Football Federation site

Football clubs in Turkey
Association football clubs established in 1980